Scott Sutcliffe (born 10 February 1963) is a former Australian rules footballer who played with Melbourne and Richmond in the Victorian Football League (VFL).

Notes

External links 		
				
		
		
		
		
1963 births
Australian rules footballers from Tasmania		
Melbourne Football Club players		
Richmond Football Club players
Clarence Football Club players
Living people